7 Chinese Brothers is a 2015 American comedy film written and directed by Bob Byington and starring Jason Schwartzman, Stephen Root, Olympia Dukakis, Jonathan Togo, and Alex Karpovsky. The film was released on August 28, 2015, in a limited release and through video on demand.

Premise
Larry (Jason Schwartzman) along with his trusty sidekick French bulldog Arrow (Schwartzman's real life pet), goes through life as a misanthropic outcast looking for work and a purpose in life.

Cast
Jason Schwartzman as Larry
Stephen Root as George
Olympia Dukakis as Grandma
Tunde Adebimpe as Major Norwood
Eleanore Pienta as Lupe
Jonathan Togo as Don
Alex Karpovsky as Kaminsky
Alex Ross Perry as Hats at Cars
Anna Margaret Hollyman as Angry Audrey
John Gatins as Dinsmore
Jordan Hargett as Dog Walker
Bob Byington as White BMW Guy
Jennifer Prediger as Lady with Glasses

Release
The film premiered at South by Southwest on March 15, 2015. On May 5, 2015, Screen Media Films acquired distribution rights to the film. The film was released on August 28, 2015, in a limited release and through video on demand.

Reception
7 Chinese Brothers received positive reviews from critics. On Rotten Tomatoes, the film has an approval rating of 78%, based on 36 reviews, with a rating of 6.2/10. On Metacritic, the film has a score of 56 out of 100, based on 16 critics, indicating "mixed or average reviews".

References

External links

2015 films
2010s English-language films
American comedy films
2015 comedy films
Films directed by Bob Byington
2010s American films